Gilles Renaud (born 25 September 1944) is a Canadian actor who has starred in cinema and television in Quebec. 

In 1983, he received a Genie Award nomination for Best Actor for the film A Day in a Taxi (Une journée en taxi). He is also a two-time Jutra Award nominee for Best Supporting Actor, receiving nods at the 9th Jutra Awards in 2007 for The Secret Life of Happy People (La Vie secrète des gens heureux) and at the 16th Jutra Awards in 2014 for The Dismantling (Le Démantèlement). 

In 2016, he appeared in the film Bad Seeds. While heavily involved in that production, he filmed a death scene for his character in his TV series Mémoires Vives, which began airing in 2013. In 2017, he starred in François Girard's film Hochelaga, Land of Souls, as a Montreal archaeologist in search of Hochelaga.

Filmography

Film

Television

References

External links

1944 births
Canadian male film actors
Canadian male television actors
Living people
Male actors from Montreal
French Quebecers